Prasophyllum incurvum is a species of orchid endemic to Tasmania. It has a single tubular, bright green leaf and up to forty brownish-green, white and purplish flowers. It is similar to P. alpestre but has larger flowers and petals which curve forwards.

Description
The edges of the upturned part of the labellum are slightly wavy and there is a yellowish-green callus in its centre. Flowering occurs from January to March.

Taxonomy and naming
Prasophyllum incurvum was first formally described in 1998 by David Jones from a specimen collected near Liawenee and the description was published in Australian Orchid Research. The specific epithet (incurvum) is a Latin word meaning "incurved" referring to the incurved petals of this species.

Distribution and habitat
This leek orchid grows in moist grassland, mostly in montane areas of the Central Plateau but also in more southern areas of Tasmania.

References

External links 
 

incurvum
Flora of Tasmania
Endemic orchids of Australia
Plants described in 1998